The 2010 Denmark Open Super Series was a top level badminton competition which was held from October 26, 2010 to October 31, 2010 in Odense, Denmark. It was the ninth BWF Super Series competition on the 2010 BWF Super Series schedule. The total purse for the event was $200,000.

Men's singles

Top half

Bottom half

Final

Women's singles

Top half

Bottom half

Final

Men's doubles

Top half

Bottom half

Final

Women's doubles

Top half

Bottom half

Final

Mixed doubles

Top half

Bottom half

Final

References

External links
Denmark Super Series 2010 at tournamentsoftware.com

Denmark Open
Denmark Super Series
Denmark
Sport in Odense